Swope Park is a city park in Kansas City, Missouri. At , it is the 51st-largest municipal park in the United States, and the largest park in Kansas City. It is named in honor of Colonel Thomas H. Swope, a philanthropist who donated the land to the city in 1896.

Most of the park is heavily wooded, and the developed area includes these major destinations: Starlight Theatre, an 8,000+ seat outdoor theater; the Swope Soccer Village sports complex; the Kansas City Zoo; the Lakeside Nature Center, one of Missouri's largest native species rehabilitation facilities; and Swope Memorial Golf Course. In 1949 the course hosted the Kansas City Open Invitational of the PGA Tour, and in 1953 it hosted the United Golf Association (UGA) National Championship, in which Ann Gregory and Charlie Sifford won the women's and men's divisions, respectively. Open seasonally, the Battle of Westport Museum & Visitor Center details the Battle of Westport in 1864, the largest American Civil War battle fought west of the Mississippi River. Other venues include baseball diamonds, soccer fields, a swimming pool, the Go Ape Zipline & Adventure Park, and ten shelter houses.

Swope Park is featured prominently in the fictional works of Robert A. Heinlein, who grew up in and around Kansas City.

References

External links
 
 Kansas City Zoo
 Starlight Theatre
 Lakeside Nature Center
 Kansas City Community Gardens

Urban public parks
Geography of Kansas City, Missouri
Parks in the Kansas City metropolitan area
Parks in Missouri
Tourist attractions in Kansas City, Missouri